Apelt is a surname. Notable people with the surname include:

Arthur Apelt (1907–1993), German conductor
Ernst Friedrich Apelt (1812–1859), German philosopher and entrepreneur
Friedel Apelt (1902–2001), German political activist, trades union official and politician
Matthäus Apelt (1594–1648), German psalmist, musician and statesman

See also 
Appelt

Surnames from given names